The 2001 Kuala Lumpur Sevens was an international rugby sevens tournament that was held in Kuala Lumpur, Malaysia as the sixth leg of the 2000–01 World Sevens Series. It was the first Malaysia Sevens tournament to be hosted as part of  the World Sevens Series, and the event took place at the Petaling Jaya Stadium on 21–22 April 2001.

In their first event as hosts, Malaysia were defeated 36–5 by Canada in the Bowl quarterfinals whilst Australia won back to back Sevens titles for the first time by defeating New Zealand 19–17 in the Cup final.

Format
The teams were drawn into four pools of four teams each. Each team played the other teams in their pool once, with 3 points awarded for a win, 2 points for a draw, and 1 point for a loss (no points awarded for a forfeit). The pool stage was played on the first day of the tournament. The top two teams from each pool advanced to the Cup/Plate brackets. he bottom two teams from each pool went on to the Bowl bracket. No Shield trophy was on offer in the 2000–01 season.

Teams
The 16 participating teams for the tournament:

Pool stage
The pool stage was played on the first day of the tournament. The 16 teams were separated into four pools of four teams and teams in the same pool played each other once. The top two teams in each pool advanced to the Cup quarterfinals to compete for the 2001 Kuala Lumpur Sevens title.

Pool A

Source: World Rugby

Pool B

Source: World Rugby

Pool C

Source: World Rugby

Pool D

Source: World Rugby

Knockout stage

Bowl

Source: World Rugby

Plate

Source: World Rugby

Cup

Source: World Rugby

Tournament placings

Source: Rugby7.com

Series standings
At the completion of Round 6:

Source: Rugby7.com

References

2000–01 IRB Sevens World Series
rugby union
2001
2001 in Asian rugby union